Nova Praha is an urban-type settlement in Oleksandriia Raion of Kirovohrad Oblast in Ukraine. It is located on the banks of the Beshka, a right tributary of the Inhulets in the basin of the Dnieper. Nova Praha hosts the administration of  Nova Praha settlement hromada, one of the hromadas of Ukraine. Population:

Economy

Transportation
It is on the railway connecting Znamianka and Dolynska with further connections to Kropyvnytskyi, Kryvyi Rih, and Mykolaiv. There is infrequent passenger traffic.

The settlement is connected by road with Kropyvnytskyi, Oleksandriia, and Novhorodka.

References

Urban-type settlements in Oleksandriia Raion